Norwood is a city in Warren County, Georgia, United States. The population was 299 at the 2000 census.

History
The Georgia General Assembly incorporated Norwood as a town in 1885. The community most likely was named after a local family.

Geography

Norwood is located at  (33.463962, -82.705700).

Demographics

At the 2000 census there were 299 people, 126 households, and 82 families living in the city. The racial makeup of the city was 37.46% White and 62.54% African American. Hispanic or Latino of any race were 0.67%.

Of the 126 households 26.2% had children under the age of 18 living with them, 40.5% were married couples living together, 19.8% had a female householder with no husband present, and 34.9% were non-families. 31.0% of households were one person and 19.0% were one person aged 65 or older. The average household size was 2.37 and the average family size was 2.99.

The age distribution was 21.1% under the age of 18, 10.0% from 18 to 24, 24.7% from 25 to 44, 22.4% from 45 to 64, and 21.7% 65 or older. The median age was 42 years. For every 100 females, there were 82.3 males. For every 100 females age 18 and over, there were 80.2 males.

The median household income was $25,000 and the median family income  was $25,909. Males had a median income of $18,542 versus $15,750 for females. The per capita income for the city was $11,597. About 22.6% of families and 20.8% of the population were below the poverty line, including 18.0% of those under the age of 18 and 27.0% of those 65 or over.

See also

 Central Savannah River Area

References

Cities in Georgia (U.S. state)
Cities in Warren County, Georgia